{{Infobox ethnic group
| group = French -Moroccans
| population = 1,500,000 (Moroccan origin) and 
(433,026) Moroccan-born people
| langs = French (Maghrebi French),  Arabic (Moroccan Arabic, Jebli Arabic, Judeo-Moroccan Arabic, Hassaniya Arabic),  Berber (Tashlhit, Tarifit, Central Atlas Tamazight),  Spanish
| rels = Majority Muslim  Judaism, and Mainly Christianity (mostly Catholic and Protestant minorities), Islam (mostly Sunni Islam) and other religions Irreligion.
| related = Algerians in FranceTunisians in France
| native_name = 
| native_name_lang = 
}}                                  French-Moroccans or Franco-Moroccans''' or simply (French: Franco-Marocains) are French people of Moroccan descent living in France. People of Moroccan origin account for a large sector of the total immigrant population in France. Following the French protectorate in Morocco from 1912 to 1956, many Moroccans chose to immigrate to France from the 1960s to the present due to France's favorable economic conditions.

Demographics                                                 
The 2011 Census recorded 433,026 Moroccan-born people.

Notable people           
.

See also                                                            
 Morocco–France relations

References